Peter Venables (3 April 1923 – 26 April 2017) was a British psychologist known for his contributions to the fields of schizophrenia and psychophysiology, including linking childhood malnutrition to later schizotypal personality. He also founded and served as the head of the department of Psychology at the University of York.

Career
Venables was the founder and former head of the department of Psychology at the University of York. He retired in 1988 to become Emeritus Professor at the University of York, where he continued to research. He was also a former President of the British Psychological Society (1979–1980), the Society for Psychophysiological Research (U.S., 1977–1978), and the Experimental Psychology Society (UK, 1968–1970). 

Venables published over 260 journal articles, book chapters, and books. Three of his articles have been recognized as citation classics. His contributions in the fields of schizophrenia and psychophysiology embraced a wide range of topics that included clinical, cognitive, neuroanatomical, psychophysiological, and neurodevelopmental issues.

Awards and recognition
His awards included one for Distinguished Contributions to Psychophysiology (U.S., Society for Psychophysiological Research, 1987), the Zubin Award for Distinguished Contributions to the Discipline from the Society for Research in Psychopathology (U.S., 1990), Honorary Membership of the Experimental Psychology Society (UK, 1993), an award from the British Association for Cognitive Neuroscience for Outstanding Contributions to British Psychophysiology (UK, 2009), and most recently the Lifetime Achievement Award for Distinguished Contributions to Psychological Knowledge (British Psychological Society, 2014).

Personal life
Venable was married in 1948 to Agnes "Ness" Hawkins (d. 2010), and had two sons, Peter and Andrew.

References

British psychologists
Academics of the University of York
Presidents of the British Psychological Society
1923 births
2017 deaths
Schizophrenia researchers